RationalWiki is an online wiki whose stated goals are to "analyze and refute pseudoscience and the anti-science movement, document 'crank' ideas, explore conspiracy theories, authoritarianism, and fundamentalism, and analyze how these subjects are handled in the media." It was created in 2007 as a counterpoint to Conservapedia after an incident in which some editors of Conservapedia were banned for vandalism. RationalWiki has been described as liberal.

History

Origin 
In April 2007, Peter Lipson, a doctor of internal medicine, attempted to edit Conservapedia's article on breast cancer to include evidence against Conservapedia's claim that abortion was linked to the disease. Conservapedia is an encyclopedia established by Andy Schlafly as an alternative to Wikipedia, which Schlafly perceived as suffering from a liberal and atheist bias. He and Conservapedia administrators "questioned [Lipson's] credentials and shut down debate". After being reverted and blocked, "Lipson and several other contributors quit trying to moderate the articles [on Conservapedia] and instead started their own website, RationalWiki".

RationalMedia Foundation 

Prior to 2010, RationalWiki's domains were registered to Trent Toulouse, and the wiki was hosted from a server located in his home. In 2010, Trent Toulouse incorporated a nonprofit organization, the RationalWiki Foundation Inc., to manage the affairs and pay the operational expenses of the website. In July 2013, the RationalWiki Foundation changed its name to the RationalMedia Foundation, stating that its aims extended beyond the RationalWiki site alone.

Content 

RationalWiki provides information about pseudoscientific theories and to educate "individuals with unorthodox views".

RationalWiki differs in several ways from the philosophy of Wikipedia and some other informational wikis. It is written from a self-described "snarky point of view" and "scientific point of view" (both abbreviated as SPOV) rather than a "neutral point of view" (NPOV), and publishes opinion, speculation, and original research. Many RationalWiki articles mockingly describe beliefs that RationalWiki opposes, especially when covering topics such as alternative medicine or fundamentalist Christians.

Some activity on RationalWiki is used for critiquing and "monitor[ing] Conservapedia". RationalWiki contributors, some of which are former Conservapedia contributors, are often highly critical of Conservapedia, and according to an article published in the Los Angeles Times in 2007, RationalWiki members "by their own admission" vandalize Conservapedia. Lester Haines of The Register stated: "Its entry entitled 'Conservapedia:Delusions' promptly mocks the claims that 'Homosexuality is a mental disorder', 'Atheists are sociopaths', and 'During the 6 days of creation G-d placed the Earth inside a black hole to slow down time so the light from distant stars had time to reach us'."

Both Yan et al. 2019 and Knoche et al., two articles about classifying a writer's biases via text analysis, asserted that Conservapedia was "conservative" and RationalWiki was "liberal". Mic described RationalWiki as "progressive".

Reception

Analysis 
Andrea Ballatore, a lecturer in GIS at Birkbeck, University of London, categorizes RationalWiki as similar in tone to Snopes in a 2015 study, finding it to be the third most visible website when researching conspiracy theories in terms of Google and Bing search results, and the most visible among those sites that made openly negative value judgments about conspiracy theories.

In Intelligent Systems 2014, Alexander Shvets stated that RationalWiki is one of the few online resources that "provide some information about pseudoscientific theories". Similarly, Keeler et al. stated that sites like RationalWiki can help to "sort out the complexities" that arise when "distant and unfamiliar and complex things are communicated to great masses of people". Biologist and pseudoscience critic Jerry Coyne has written that its articles appear slanted toward the "authoritarian Left".

A 2019 study of bias analysis based on word embedding in RationalWiki, Conservapedia, and Wikipedia by researchers from RWTH Aachen University found all had significant gender biases, reflecting classical gender stereotypes, but these biases were less pronounced in RationalWiki. RationalWiki's characterization of indigenous science as pseudoscience was described as "Eurocentric gatekeeping" by Lindy Orthia of Australian National University.

Usage 
In Critical Thinking: Pseudoscience and the Paranormal, Jonathan C. Smith lists RationalWiki in an exercise on finding and identifying fallacies. Snopes has quoted RationalWiki for background on Sorcha Faal of the European Union Times. RationalWiki's description of the "Lenski affair" was quoted by Magnus Ramage in Perspectives on Information and cited by Tom Kaden in Creationism and Anti-Creationism in the United States. It was quoted by Thomas Leitch in Wikipedia U: Knowledge, Authority, and Liberal Education in the Digital Age on the history of Citizendium. RationalWiki was cited by Dorit Rubinstein Reiss and Lois Weithorn in Responding to the Childhood Vaccination Crisis about the website Whale.to, saying that it is an "infamous conspiracy site", using RationalWiki as a source. RationalWiki's explanation of Gish gallops was referenced by The Guardian in an article on climate change denial and Erik Krabbe and Jan van Laar in an article on "quibbles". RationalWiki's description of the history and membership of LessWrong was quoted by Beth Singler in Existential Hope and Existential Despair in AI Apocalypticism and Transhumanism and cited by Saswat Sarangi and Pankaj Sharma in Artificial Intelligence. The Daily Beast writer Charles Davis alleges that, according to Libcom.org, Angela Nagle's Kill All Normies has "several passages" that "are similar to entries in Wikipedia and another online encyclopedia, RationalWiki".

Writing in The Verge, Adi Robertson stated that RationalWiki provided a good explanation of Time Cube, though conveying the "full impression" of the original Time Cube website was all but impossible.

See also 

 List of wikis
 List of online encyclopedias

References

External links 

 

American websites
Critics of alternative medicine
Critics of creationism
Free-content websites
Internet properties established in 2007
Online encyclopedias
MediaWiki websites
Scientific skepticism
Wiki communities
Wikis
Russian-language encyclopedias
American encyclopedias
New Atheism
Secularism
Liberalism in the United States
Progressivism in the United States